Chester is a census-designated place that comprises the populated center of the town of Chester in Hampden County, Massachusetts, United States. The population of the CDP was 627 at the 2010 census, out of 1,337 in the entire town of Chester. It is part of the Springfield, Massachusetts Metropolitan Statistical Area.

Geography
The Chester CDP is in the western part of the town of Chester, along U.S. Route 20 (Main Street) in the valley of the West Branch of the Westfield River where it is joined by Walker Brook.

Demographics

References

Populated places in Hampden County, Massachusetts
Census-designated places in Hampden County, Massachusetts
Census-designated places in Massachusetts
Springfield metropolitan area, Massachusetts